The Amalgamated Society of Lithographic Printers (ASLP) was a trade union representing printers and their assistants in the United Kingdom and Ireland.

History
The Central Association of Lithographic and Copper-Plate Printers' Societies was founded in or before 1860 by local trade unions, in Belfast, Dublin, Edinburgh, Glasgow, Liverpool, Manchester and Sheffield. Unions in Bradford and Stockport later joined, and in 1879 the Bradford and Manchester unions took the initiative in establishing a new, centralised union.  This was the Amalgamated Society of Lithographic Printers and Auxiliaries, based in Manchester.

The union initially had about 500 members, but it grew rapidly under the leadership of George Davy Kelley, setting up its own offices in Manchester. The Manchester branch ran the union, with it electing the entire executive until 1914.  Membership grew to about 3,500 by 1900, and reached 5,168 in 1915.  In 1930, it was further boosted when the Litho Music Printers merged into the ASLP.

In the 1950s and 1960s, there was a boom in lithographic printing, and although it led membership to increase to 11,000, the union worried that it would lose control of the trade. As a result, in 1969, it merged into the National Graphical Association.

Election results
The union sponsored its general secretary as a Labour Party candidate in the 1906 UK general election.

General Secretaries
1879: George Davy Kelley
1912: Thomas Sproat
1931: F. F. Boaler
1937: R. T. Williams
1958: Stanley Gilman
1960: Ron Emerick

References

Defunct trade unions of the United Kingdom
Lithographers' trade unions
Trade unions established in 1879
Trade unions disestablished in 1969
Trade unions based in Greater Manchester